Thomas James Burns AO (27 October 1931 – 4 June 2007) was an Australian politician who led the Labor Party (ALP) in Queensland between 1974 and 1978 and was Deputy Premier of Queensland between 1989 and 1996. He served as the Member for Lytton in the Parliament of Queensland between 1972 and 1996. Burns had previously served as the Federal President of Labor between 1970 and 1973, playing a key role in modernising the party prior to the election of Gough Whitlam as the Prime Minister of Australia in 1972.

Early life and career

Tom Burns was born in Maryborough, Queensland in October 1931. After attending Brisbane Grammar School, he spent six years in the Royal Australian Air Force before becoming involved in politics.

Burns worked as an organiser for the Labor Party between 1960 and 1965 before his promotion to the position as Queensland State Secretary of the ALP. As State Secretary, he played a critical role in persuading the Queensland delegates to the National Executive to vote against the expulsion of Whitlam from the ALP in 1966.

Senior people wanted Burns to become the National Secretary of the Australian Labor Party in 1969 where he would run the party's campaign in the 1969 Federal election. When he was reluctant, Mick Young was appointed as the National Secretary.

He was elected as the National President of the ALP in 1970. Burns was heavily involved in Federal intervention in the New South Wales and Victorian branches, conducting a report into the affairs of the NSW Branch and taking over administrative responsibility with Young for the Victorian Branch. His report on the NSW Branch was critical of the running of the 1968 preselection of Paul Keating as the candidate for the Division of Blaxland. The Federal intervention into the Victorian and NSW branches was a critical factor in Labor's success in the 1972 Federal election.

Parliamentary career

At the 1972 Queensland election, Burns was elected as the member for Lytton, which is a safe Labor seat. He took over the leadership of the Queensland branch of the Labor Party in 1974 after Labor was reduced to a "cricket team" of 11 members. Burns managed to gain 12 seats in the 1977 election but the Coalition continued to enjoy a healthy majority. He resigned as leader of the Labor Party in 1978.

In 1984, Burns was elected as Deputy Leader of the ALP with Nev Warburton as Leader. He retained the Deputy Leadership when Wayne Goss became the leader, and served as Deputy Premier between 1989 and 1996, holding a variety of ministerial portfolios. Burns retired from the Deputy Leadership and from the Parliament in 1996.

Later years

Burns remained active in public life after his retirement from politics. He had a long-term interest in China having been a member of the first Australian delegation to China in the 1970s led by Gough Whitlam. In July 1999, the Beattie Government appointed him as Chair of the Queensland-China Council and he was made an Officer of the Order of Australia in 2001 for his contribution to Australia's relationship with China.

Burns died in June 2007, aged 75.

References

1931 births
2007 deaths
Deputy Premiers of Queensland
Members of the Queensland Legislative Assembly
Leaders of the Opposition in Queensland
Officers of the Order of Australia
Australian Labor Party members of the Parliament of Queensland
20th-century Australian politicians